Fillmore is a hamlet (and census-designated place) in the town of Hume, Allegany County, New York, United States. As of the 2010 census it had a population of 603. It was originally known as "The Mouth of the Creek" but was named for President Millard Fillmore in 1850. The former village of Fillmore dissolved its incorporation and is now simply a named hamlet southeast of the town center of Hume. Fillmore is the mailing address of the Hungarian Scout Camp, the main campsite of the Hungarian Scout Association in Exteris, although the camp is technically within the neighboring town of Granger. Fillmore is also the site of the Most Holy Family Monastery which was deemed a hate group by the anti-Catholic Southern Poverty Law Center (SPLC) in February 2017.

Geography

Demographics

References

Hamlets in New York (state)
New York (state) populated places on the Genesee River
Former villages in New York (state)
Census-designated places in Allegany County, New York
Census-designated places in New York (state)
Hamlets in Allegany County, New York